Arclight is the fourth solo album by American jazz guitarist Julian Lage. Two tracks were given a prerelease, "Nocturne" and "Harlem Blues".

Background 
Arclight was recorded on a Telecaster, which is not generally considered to be a jazz guitar. Lage stated in an interview that "the electric guitar was always so fascinating to me, and my guitar heroes played it...Stevie Ray Vaughan...Clapton or whatnot—Muddy Waters."
While most of the tunes on the album are originals, there are several "pre-bebop" compositions, from "before things got kind of codified and slick and refined", in Lage's words. Lage said he enjoyed such tunes mostly because of the chord changes, what he described as a "slippery approach to basically fundamental harmony".

"Nocturne", one of the pre-release singles, was an old Spike Hughes composition. Lage said he liked this tune because "it starts on this minor chord, and...it's very hard to find...songs that weren't major, that weren't happy, that weren't just total dance music".

According to Lage, the chord progression played on "Harlem Blues" (a W. C. Handy composition) was inspired by Willard Robison's chord changes for the song, slightly different from Handy's simpler progression.

Reception 

Critical reception was generally positive. Troy Collins of All About Jazz called it a "brisk but bracing affair", while Doug Collette of the same publisher noted "Lage proves himself not just a student of his instrument...but an exceedingly fast learner in the art of studio recording." Collette praised producer Jesse Harris, saying "Harris deserves extra credit for the size and clarity of the recorded sound here because that introductory track arises from the speaker...with as much presence as magnitude."

Irish Times critic Cormac Larkin said that the album had "echoes of Bill Frisell and particularly Jim Hall", the latter being one of Lage's major influences.

Track listing 
All compositions written by Julian Lage except where noted.
 Fortune Teller – 3:03
 Persian Rug (Charlie Daniels/Gus Kahn) – 2:23
 Nocturne (Spike Hughes) – 3:19
 Supera – 4:01
 Stop Go Start – 3:31
 Activate – 2:08
 Presley – 4:12
 Prospero – 3:08
 I'll Be Seeing You (Sammy Fain/Irving Kahal) – 3:31
 Harlem Blues (W. C. Handy) – 3:27
 Ryland – 4:02

Personnel 
 Julian Lage – electric guitar
 Scott Colley – bass
 Kenny Wollesen – drums, vibraphone

Charts

References 

Julian Lage albums
2016 albums
Mack Avenue Records albums